Vroom Vroom is the second extended play by English singer and songwriter Charli XCX, released on 26 February 2016 by Vroom Vroom Recordings. It features production work from Scottish producer Sophie.

The EP's experimental pop sound divided critics and fans upon release but accrued a cult following, and has been retrospectively credited as a pioneering work in what would later be termed the hyperpop movement.

Background and release
In July 2015, in an interview with British fashion magazine i-D, Charli XCX said that she was working on her third album and described it as "the most pop thing, and the most electronic thing" she had done. Scottish producer Sophie was confirmed to be involved in the album's production. In October 2015, Charli XCX released "Vroom Vroom", which was the first song released from the EP, on the Beats 1 Radio Show, then claiming it would be the first song released from her third studio album.

On 23 February 2016, it was announced that Charli XCX had set up a new record label, Vroom Vroom Recordings, and that she would release an EP titled Vroom Vroom on 27 February 2016. The second song released from the EP, titled "Trophy", received its first play on Zane Lowe's Beats 1 show on that night. Charli XCX will also host her own Beats 1 show fortnightly.

Charli XCX released a music video for the song "Vroom Vroom" on 22 April 2016 via Apple Music. On 27 May 2016, an autographed vinyl version of the EP was released in a limited run of 1,000 copies by Warner Music.

On 29 August 2020, 2,000 copies of the EP were released on transparent vinyl for Record Store Day.

Critical reception

At Metacritic, which assigns a normalised rating out of 100 to reviews from mainstream critics, the album received an average score of 64, which indicates "generally favorable reviews", based on nine reviews.

Spin gave the album a favorable review, stating that, "Vroom Vroom is scintillating new ground for Charli, totally unlike anything she's ever done before, and still quintessentially her in its streamlined, indomitable turbo-pop." Tiny Mix Tapes wrote "this is pop music reinventing itself, reasserting its autonomy," describing Sophie's production as "like liquid metal or maybe the noise equivalent of non-Euclidean geometry." The Line of Best Fit wrote that the album "sounds like a kind of nihilist, amphetamine laden rebellion; A mish mash of poppy melodies, rap, trap beats and doom ridden synth which, though on paper sounds like chaos, is clearly painstakingly curated."

Ian Gormely of Exclaim! praised "Paradise" as the "standout" track, but criticized Sophie's utilisation of vocals "across the entire EP" and expressed that the compatibility of Charli and Sophie ranged from "unstoppable" to "shoehorned". Gormely concluded that "there's enough that works on Vroom Vroom to hope that it's the beginning of something much bigger". Drowned in Sound Lee Adcock compared the EP positively to Charli's previous album Sucker, but criticized its usage of "pre-established styles of other black artists" to create "PG-rated, glittery sketches of excess bling and forbidden love". In April 2022, Clash's Ruby Carter characterized the EP as a "blueprint for bubblegum pop" that cemented Charli's "vision for Charli 2.0 and a predecessor for her more experimental work on Pop 2, Charli, and How I'm Feeling Now."

In a negative review for Pitchfork, Laura Snapes wrote that "no one is being done any favors reducing Charli XCX to a vapid cypher, particularly as it drains her vivid personality from the work". However, in November 2019, Snapes expressed regret about her review, tweeting that she would like to "publicly disavow the nonsense" she wrote about the EP. In October 2021, Pitchfork included it in their "Rescored" list, with Cat Zhang suggesting an adjustment of the EP's score from 4.5 to 7.8, retrospectively claiming that, "[a]t the time, many critics seemed to be paranoid about PC Music's motives. Nervous that they'd be bamboozled, they obsessed over whether a pop experiment was either satire or sincere."

Track listing

Notes
  signifies a vocal producer
  signifies an additional producer
 "Trophy" contains an audio snippet from the motion picture Pulp Fiction performed by Uma Thurman

Personnel 
Credits adapted from Tidal.

 Charli XCX – lead vocals
 Noonie Bao – additional vocals 
 Kate Kennedy – additional vocals 
 MNDR – additional vocals 
 Rob Orton – mixer 
 Sophie – mixer , programming 
 Jodie Harsh – mixer, programming 
 Stuart Hawkes – mastering engineer
 Tony Lake – additional engineer 
 Richard Adlam – sound effects, additional programming 
 Hal Ritson – sound effects, additional programming

Charts

Vroom Vroom (single)

Vroom Vroom EP

References

2016 EPs
Charli XCX albums
Avant-pop EPs
Albums produced by Sophie (musician)
Asylum Records EPs
Hyperpop albums